Jérôme Faucheur (born in 1953) is a French organist, improviser and Professor of Organ in the schools of Bondues, Comines and Hazebrouck as well as in the Institute of Sacred Music in Lille. He is titular of the organs in Bondues and Wambrechies.

Biography 
Jérôme Faucheur was born in 1953 in Lille, France. He won the gold medal for organ and improvisation in 1974 at the Conservatory of Lille, the first Prize in the Tournois du Royaume de la Musique, and holds the ‘Diplome Superieur d'Orgue’ from the Sacred Music Institute of Rouen. He is former student of Rolande Falcinelli.

He played almost 400 organ recitals in the America, Europe and Australia.

External links
http://samuel.lille.free.fr/profjfaucheur.htm 

1953 births
French classical organists
French male organists
Living people
21st-century organists
21st-century French male musicians
Male classical organists